Dimiter Manolov (Димитър Манолов; 20 July 1940 – 25 September 1998 in Bogota) was a Bulgarian conductor. He was chief conductor of the Sofia State Philharmonic from 1976 at the age of 36.

Discography
 The Golden Cockerel

References

1940 births
1998 deaths
Bulgarian conductors (music)
20th-century conductors (music)